Mount Holly Cemetery is a  historic cemetery located in the Quapaw Quarter area of downtown Little Rock in the U.S. state of Arkansas, and is the burial place for numerous Arkansans of note. It was listed on the National Register of Historic Places in 1970 and has been nicknamed "The Westminster Abbey of Arkansas".

Major events

"Tales of the Crypt"
Every year in October several drama students from Parkview Arts and Science Magnet High School are each given a person buried in the cemetery to research. They then prepare short monologues or dialogues, complete with period costumes, to be performed in front of the researched person's grave. Audiences are led through the cemetery from grave to grave by guides with candles. The event is called "Tales of the Crypt". Although it takes place around the same time as the American holiday Halloween, the event is meant to be historic rather than spooky.

2016 vandalism
The cemetery experienced heavy vandalism in the overnight hours of April 20, 2016.  Numerous headstones were toppled and smashed, including the well-known statues of a mourner next to statues of two little girls.

Notable burials
The cemetery is the burial place for ten former Arkansas governors, six United States senators, 14 Arkansas Supreme Court justices, 21 Little Rock mayors, numerous Arkansas literary figures, Confederate generals, and other worthies. There are also several slaves who are buried there, marked by modest gravestones.

 Samuel Adams (1805–1850), Arkansas Governor
 Dale Alford (1916–2000), U.S. Representative (1959–63) and ophthalmologist
 Chester Ashley (1791–1848), US Senator
 W. Jasper Blackburn (1820–1899), US Congressman
 Solon Borland (1811–1864), physician and US Senator
 Elias Nelson Conway (1812–1892), Arkansas Governor

 Jeff Davis (1862–1913), Arkansas Governor
 David Owen Dodd (1846–1864), boy martyr of the Confederacy
 James Philip Eagle (1837–1904), Arkansas Governor
 James Fleming Fagan (1828–1893), Confederate Major General
 Sandford C. Faulkner (1803–1874), the original 'Arkansas Traveller'
 John Gould Fletcher (1886–1950), Pulitzer Prize–winning poet, with his wife, noted children's book author Charlie May Simon (1897–1977)
 Thomas Fletcher (1817–1880), acting governor of Arkansas (1862)
 William Savin Fulton (1795–1844), U.S. senator from Arkansas (1836–1844)
 Augustus Hill Garland (1876–1907), Arkansas Governor
 John N. Heiskell (1872–1972), US Senator and editor of the Arkansas Gazette
 Simon Pollard Hughes Jr. (1830–1906), Arkansas Governor
 George Izard (1776–1828), governor of Arkansas Territory from 1825 to 1828
 Robert Ward Johnson (1814–1879), C.S. senator from Arkansas (1862–1865)
 George R. Mann (1856–1939), architect
 William Read Miller (1823–1887) Arkansas Governor

 Allison Nelson (1822–1862), politician and Confederate Brigadier General
 Thomas Willoughby Newton (1804–1853) US Congressman

 Elizabeth Quatie Brown Ross, wife of John Ross (Cherokee chief) (1791–1839), Cherokee figure
 Albert Rust (1818–1870), US Congressman and Confederate Brigadier General (cenotaph)
 Ambrose Hundley Sevier (1801–1848), politician
 Bernard Smith (1776–1835), US Congressman
 David D. Terry (1881–1963), US Congressman
 Cephas Washburn (1793–1860), missionary
 Edward Washburn (1831–1860), artist
 Frank D. White (1933–2003), governor of Arkansas from 1981 to 1983
 William W. Wilshire (1830–1888), U.S. representative from 1873 to 1877; chief justice of the Arkansas Supreme Court from 1868 to 1871
 William E. Woodruff (1795–1885), founder of the Arkansas Gazette

See also
National Register of Historic Places listings in Little Rock, Arkansas

References

External links 

 Official
 
 General information
 Mount Holly Cemetery at Encyclopedia of Arkansas History & Culture
 Mount Holly Cemetery at Find A Grave
 Mount Holly Cemetery at The Political Graveyard

1843 establishments in Arkansas
1840s architecture in the United States
Cemeteries in Little Rock, Arkansas
Cemeteries on the National Register of Historic Places in Arkansas
Cemetery vandalism and desecration
Monuments and memorials in Little Rock, Arkansas
National Register of Historic Places in Little Rock, Arkansas
Protected areas of Pulaski County, Arkansas
Tourist attractions in Little Rock, Arkansas
Cemeteries established in the 1840s